Qarajalu (also Romanized as Qarājalū; also known as Qarah Jahlū) is a village in Bakeshluchay Rural District, in the Central District of Urmia County, West Azerbaijan Province, Iran. At the 2006 census, its population was 72, in 17 families.

References 

Populated places in Urmia County